Parco dei Colli di Bergamo is a natural park in the province of Bergamo, Lombardy, northern Italy.

Geography 

The largest part of the surface of the park is covered by woods. The fauna of the park  includes foxes, European badgers and others mammals, while the European robin is the most widespread bird.

The park is crossed by the Morla and Quisa rivers.

References 

Colli di Bergamo
Colli di Bergamo
Protected areas established in 1977
Province of Bergamo
Protected areas of the Alps